Dorcus arrowi is a species in the Stag Beetle family Lucanidae. It is found in Indomalaya, including Vietnam, Thailand, and China.

Subspecies
These four subspecies are members of Dorcus arrowi:
 Dorcus arrowi fukinukii (Schenk, 2000)
 Dorcus arrowi katctinensis Nagai, 2000
 Dorcus arrowi lieni Maeda, 2012
 Dorcus arrowi magdaleinae (Lacroix, 1972)

References

Lucaninae
Beetles of Asia
Beetles described in 1911